KKBZ (105.1 FM, "The Blaze") is an American radio station  broadcasting a Mainstream rock format. Licensed to Auberry, California, the station serves the greater Fresno/Clovis area. The station is currently owned by Lotus Communications.  Its studios are located just north of downtown Fresno.

History
The station was assigned call sign KXDR on July 12, 1990.  On March 27, 1992, the station changed its call sign to KSLK, on October 7, 1994, to KGST-FM, on August 1, 1995, to KLBN, and on May 5, 2008, to the current KKBZ. The station did make headlines when they fired their very popular morning show "Jen Lipp in the Morning," hosted by largely popular morning rock DJ Jennifer Lipp and co-hosted by a new-to-the business Kris DeVold. The station got major backlash from social media as well as local press. They then cycled through a syndicated morning show out of Sacramento only to eventually return to an all-music morning.

Programming
The current weekday lineup includes music in the mornings followed by a 105-minute commercial-free music block.  The mid-day shift allows listeners to make request's and win concert tickets, prizes, and food.  Sixx Sense with Nikki Sixx of Mötley Crüe airs overnight. Weekends include Dee Snider with a 2-hour show called House Of Hair which features hair and metal bands from the 1980s. In 2016, the station was made an affiliate for the Los Angeles Rams.

Previous logo

References

External links
105.1 The Blaze official website

KBZ
Classic rock radio stations in the United States
Radio stations established in 1990
1990 establishments in California
Lotus Communications stations